Elina Haavio-Mannila (born 3 August 1933) is a Finnish social scientist and Professor Emerita of Sociology at the University of Helsinki where she served as the Docent of Sociology (1965–1971), Assistant Professor (1971–1992), and Professor (1992–1998). She is known for researching gender roles and gender in Finnish life. Much of the research in the latter field was done together with Osmo Kontula. In 1958, she became the first woman in Finland to earn the Doctor in Social Sciences degree.

Early years and education

Elina Haavio was born in Helsinki on 3 August 1933. Her parents were Martti Haavio and Elsa Enäjärvi-Haavio.

Career
Haavio-Mannila became attracted to sociology during her studies after reading an English-language elementary textbook on the subject. In her 1958 dissertation, Kylätappelut – Sosiologinen tutkimus Suomen kylätappeluinstituutiosta ("Village Village - Sociological Research of the Finnish Village Bomb Institute"), Haavio-Mannila wrote about village attacks. Erik Allardt inspired her to study gender roles. In addition, she also studied the work of health care professionals and doctors, the role of the sexes and the roles in family, work, politics and alcohol use, and the adaptation of migrants.

In the 1950s and 1960s, sociology was an important and popular subject from the point of view of the development of Finnish society, and according to Haavio-Mannila's assessment, it still provides "useful information and explanatory models for the development of social life". In the 1960s, she became associated with the Yhdistys 9, Sexpo, and women's organizations. Haavio-Mannila's book, The Finnish woman and man (1968) is a pioneer in Finnish women's and gender roles research.

The early history of Finnish sociology was discussed in the Roots of Sociology (1973) and the History of Finnish Sociology (1992). A book by Haavio-Mannila and Kontula in 1993, Finnish sex attracted attention at the end of the 1990s, as there was opposition by some to their research results, citing the relative rarity of homosexuality .

During her academic career, Haavio-Mannila was often in the media commenting on social issues and writing several books. She has been a member of the Marriage Law, Alcohol Act, Working Time and Working Conditions Committees. She has held leadership positions in Finnish and international scientific organizations and continues to participate in international conferences through presentations of her ongoing research.

Associations
Haavio-Mannila was elected a member of the Finnish Academy of Science and Letters in 1975. She has been a member of the Academia Europaea since 1993, and served as the head of the Finnish Academy of Sciences (1995–1996).

Later life
In her retirement years, she has been actively involved in two broad international research projects: “Refer: Reproductive Health and Family Models in Russia, Estonia and Finland” and “Gentrans: Generations Chain - Study on Interaction and Helping each other with Large Baby Boomers and Their Children and Parents”. She characterizes retirement research as volunteering, for which she has received congressional assistance with travel and a computer. Haavio-Mannila has been following the development of computing for several decades and says she is "completely happy when I open my computer and find the files I need for the article, book, or message I have at hand". In her research, she is attracted by the statistical analysis she "designs at night by bedtime and in the morning before getting up".

Awards
2004, Warelius Award of the Finnish Bookwriters Association

Selected works 
Haavio-Mannila, Elina: Kylätappelut - Sosiologinen tutkimus Suomen kylätappeluinstituutiosta. WSOY, 1958.
Haavio-Mannila, Elina: Suomalainen nainen ja mies – asema ja muuttuvat roolit. WSOY 1968.
Haavio-Mannila, Elina & Snicker, Raija: Päivätanssit. WSOY 1980. .
Haavio-Mannila, Elina, Jallinoja, Riitta & Strandell, Harriet: Perhe, työ ja tunteet – Ristiriitoja ja ratkaisuja. WSOY 1984. .
Haavio-Mannila, Elina et al. (toim.): Women in Nordic Politics. Pergamon Press 1985.
Haavio-Mannila, Elina: Työpaikan rakkaussuhteet. WSOY 1988. .
Alapuro, Risto & Alestalo, Matti & Haavio-Mannila, Elina (toim.): Suomalaisen sosiologian historia. Porvoo Helsinki Juva: WSOY, 1992. .
Kontula, Osmo & Haavio-Mannila, Elina (toim.): Suomalainen seksi: Tietoa suomalaisten sukupuolielämän muutoksesta. WSOY, 1993. .
Haavio-Mannila, Elina & Kontula, Osmo: Seksin trendit meillä ja naapureissa. WSOY, 2001. . Myös englanniksi Sexual Trends in the Baltic Sea Area. The Family Federation of Finland 2003. .
Kontula, Osmo & Haavio-Mannila, Elina: Intohimon hetkiä: Seksuaalisen läheisyyden kaipuu ja täyttymys omaelämäkertojen kuvaamana. WSOY, 2001. .
Haavio-Mannila, Elina & Kontula, Osmo & Rotkirch, Anna: Sexual Lifestyles in the Twentieth Century. Palgrave 2002. .

See also
 List of firsts in Finland

References

External links
Elina Haavio-Mannila  at University of Helsinki

1933 births
Academic staff of the University of Helsinki
Finnish sociologists
Finnish women sociologists
20th-century Finnish writers
20th-century Finnish women writers
21st-century Finnish writers
21st-century Finnish women writers
Gender studies academics
Living people